Katharine Connal (8 June 1912 – 1983) was a British athlete. She competed in the women's javelin throw at the 1936 Summer Olympics where she finished in 14th position.

References

External links
 

1912 births
1983 deaths
Athletes (track and field) at the 1936 Summer Olympics
British female javelin throwers
Olympic athletes of Great Britain
Place of birth missing